Curling at the 2015 Canada Winter Games took place at the Prince George Golf and Curling Club in Prince George, British Columbia. The men's event ran from Saturday, February 14, 2015 to Friday, February 20, 2015. The women's event ran from Sunday, February 22, 2015 to Saturday, February 28, 2015.

Medallists

Men

Teams

 withdrew from the men's event

Round-robin standings
Final round-robin standings

Round-robin results
The draw is listed as follows:

Draw 1
Sunday, February 15, 10:00

Draw 2
Sunday, February 15, 15:00

Draw 3
Monday, February 16, 10:00

Draw 4
Monday, February 16, 15:00

Draw 5
Tuesday, February 17, 10:00

Draw 6
Tuesday, February 17, 15:00

Draw 7
Wednesday, February 18, 9:00

Tie-Breaker
Wednesday, February 18, 15:00

Crossover
Thursday, February 19, 12:00

Thursday, February 19, 19:00

Friday, February 20, 9:00

Playoffs

Quarterfinals
Thursday, February 19, 12:00

Semifinals
Thursday, February 19, 19:00

Fifth Place Game
Friday, February 20, 9:00

Bronze Medal Game
Friday, February 20, 13:00

Gold Medal Game
Friday, February 20, 17:00

Final standings

Women

Teams

Round-robin standings
Final round-robin standings

Round-robin results
The draw is listed as follows:

Draw 1
Monday, February 23, 10:00

Draw 2
Monday, February 23, 15:00

Draw 3
Tuesday, February 24, 10:00

Draw 4
Tuesday, February 24, 15:00

Draw 5
Wednesday, February 25, 10:00

Draw 6
Wednesday, February 25, 15:00

Draw 7
Thursday, February 26, 9:00

Tie-Breakers
Thursday, February 26, 15:00

Thursday, February 26, 20:30

Crossover

Friday, February 27, 12:00

Friday, February 27, 19:00

Saturday, February 21, 9:00

Playoffs

Quarterfinals
Friday, February 27, 12:00

Semifinals
Friday, February 27, 19:00

Fifth Place Game
Saturday, February 28, 9:00

Bronze Medal Game
Saturday, February 28, 13:00

Gold Medal Game
Saturday, February 28, 17:00

Final standings

References

External links
Prince George Golf and Curling Club
Curling Technical Package
Curling Overview

2015 in curling
Curling in British Columbia
2015 Canada Winter Games